Yemeni coup d'état may refer to:

Alwaziri coup
Houthi takeover in Yemen
North Yemen Civil War
South Yemen Civil War